George Andrew Beck (28 May 1904 – 13 September 1978) was an English prelate who served in the Roman Catholic Church as Archbishop of Liverpool from 29 January 1964 to 7 February 1976.

Beck was born in Streatham in south London. He was educated at Clapham College and later at the Assumptionist College of St Michael at Hitchin in Hertfordshire. In 1927, he was ordained priest in the order of the Assumptionists (or Augustinians of the Assumption). He was headmaster of the Becket School in Nottingham and in 1948, he was appointed coadjutor Bishop of Brentwood and titular bishop of Tigias. He succeeded as Bishop of Brentwood in 1951 was subsequently Bishop of Salford from 1955 to 1964. As Bishop of Salford he continued the substantial expansion of new parishes and schools begun by his predecessor, Henry Vincent Marshall, to implement the Education Act. Beck was an educational expert, and successfully led negotiations with successive governments to better the position of Catholic schools across the country. In 1964 he was appointed Archbishop of Liverpool, from which he resigned at the age of 71 in 1976.

Archbishop Beck Catholic Sports College in the Walton area of Liverpool is named after him.

References

1904 births
1978 deaths
20th-century Roman Catholic archbishops in the United Kingdom
People from Streatham
Assumptionists
Roman Catholic bishops of Brentwood
Roman Catholic archbishops of Liverpool
Participants in the Second Vatican Council
Roman Catholic bishops of Salford
British Roman Catholic archbishops